Waterford Borough Historic District is a national historic district located at Waterford, Erie County, Pennsylvania.  It includes 41 contributing buildings in the central business district and surrounding residential areas of Waterford.  The district includes commercial and residential buildings built between 1820 and 1939.  They are in a variety of popular architectural styles including Greek Revival, Federal, and Italianate.  The district includes the town square.  Notable buildings include the St. Peter's Episcopal Church (1832), Presbyterian Church (c. 1850), Amos Judson House, and Judson's Store (1820).  The district includes the separately listed Eagle Hotel (1826).

It was added to the National Register of Historic Places in 1990.

References

External links
 St. Peter's Episcopal Church, Cherry Street, Waterford, Erie County, PA: 1 photo at Historic American Buildings Survey
 Amos Judson House, Waterford, Erie County, PA: 1 photo at Historic American Buildings Survey

Historic American Buildings Survey in Pennsylvania
Historic districts on the National Register of Historic Places in Pennsylvania
Federal architecture in Pennsylvania
Greek Revival architecture in Pennsylvania
Italianate architecture in Pennsylvania
Buildings and structures in Erie, Pennsylvania
National Register of Historic Places in Erie County, Pennsylvania